Telipna citrimaculata is a butterfly in the family Lycaenidae. It is found in Cameroon, the Republic of the Congo, the Central African Republic, the Democratic Republic of the Congo and Uganda. The habitat consists of forests.

Subspecies
Telipna citrimaculata citrimaculata (Cameroon, northern Congo, Central African Republic, Democratic Republic of the Congo)
Telipna citrimaculata neavei Bethune-Baker, 1926 (Democratic Republic of the Congo, western Uganda)
Telipna citrimaculata victoriae Libert, 2005 (south-eastern Uganda)

References

Butterflies described in 1916
Poritiinae
Butterflies of Africa